Philadelphia Chickens is a book/music CD combination by Sandra Boynton and Michael Ford, published in 2002. The first half of the book contains lyrics and illustrations, while the second half contains musical notation for each song. It was reviewed favorably by The Philadelphia Inquirer and was also reviewed by Publishers Weekly.

A new edition of the songbook with updated illustrations will be released on September 5, 2023.

Tracks/Chapters

References

2002 books
2002 compilation albums
Workman Publishing Company books
Sandra Boynton albums
Children's songs